Kamtorn Sanidwong na Ayudhya (6 September 1925 – 22 November 2000) was a Thai music educator. He pioneered the introduction of Western art music (classical music) education in Thai universities, particularly at the Chulalongkorn University's Faculty of Education, where he was an assistant professor. He was also an athlete, and competed in the men's long jump at the 1952 Summer Olympics.

References

External links
 

Kamtorn Sanidwong
Kamtorn Sanidwong
Kamtorn Sanidwong
Kamtorn Sanidwong
Athletes (track and field) at the 1952 Summer Olympics
Place of birth missing
1925 births
Kamtorn Sanidwong
2000 deaths
Kamtorn Sanidwong